is a Japanese superhero ninja featured in several manga and anime, as well as live-action movies and TV shows. Akakage first appeared in the 1967 TV series, Kamen no Ninja Akakage which was produced by Toei Company Ltd.

Character
Akakage is a ninja who wears a red-and-black costume and a stylized red mask. He was created by Japanese manga artist Mitsuteru Yokoyama. His adventures are set in Feudal Japan, where Akakage and his ninja sidekicks,  and  fight evil warlords. The ninjas use their superhuman fighting powers and high-tech gadgets to defeat these warlords in a genre referred to as daikaiju, in which protagonists combat a range of humanoid monsters.

1967 Tokusatsu series
, was produced by Toei Company Ltd., and aired on KTV and Fuji TV from April 5, 1967, to March 27, 1968, with a total of 52 episodes (divided into four segments). Akakage was played by Yuzaburo Sakaguchi, Aokage was played by Yoshinobu Kaneko and Shirokage was played by Fuyukichi Maki.

Development
This was Toei's first color tokusatsu superhero show and Japan's first color live-action ninja TV series. Aokage's footage from the series was used to create several Watari films with the titles like The Magic Sword of Watari (not to be confused with the unrelated 1966 film Watari, Ninja Boy).

Plot 
The story is set in the late sixteenth century when Japan was in the midst of a long period of civil wars. While some seek to unite Japan in order to bring peace, there are others who encourage conflict in order to bring more power to themselves. Akakage, Aokage, and Shirokage are all good ninjas working for those who seek peace and unity and battling against evil ninjas and their daikaiju (giant monsters).

Aka-Kage, made by Mitsuteru Yokoyama, is a ninja who wears a red-and-black costume and a stylized red mask. His adventures take place in Feudal Japan, where he and his ninja sidekicks Aokage (青影? a little boy) and Shirokage (白影?an old man) fight evil warlords, wizards, and daikaiju using high-tech gadgets (a blatant anachronism in a period setting).

Characters
Akakage is the best swordsman of the three and a master of disguise. The crystal in his mask fires an energy beam. Akakage appears on the scene proclaiming "Akakage Sanjō!"
Aokage is a young boy who plays with explosives and uses a chain weapon.
Shirokage is armed with a pole weapon and flies using a large kite.

1987 anime series 
 is the anime remake produced by Toei that aired on Nippon Television from October 13, 1987, to March 22, 1988, with a total of 23 episodes. The complete series was released on DVD by Toei Video on June 10, 2015.

Video game 

A video game was created based on the anime version. It was released in 1988, by Toei, for the Famicom. The game music was composed by J-Walk.

2001 live-action film 

 is a loose remake of the original Akakage series. It was released in 2001 and was directed by Hiroyuki Nakano. It stars Masanobu Andō in the title role. The story, characters, and their costumes were, however, re-designed from scratch.

References

External links 
 
 Akakage at Vintage Ninja
 

1967 Japanese television series debuts
1987 anime television series debuts
1988 video games
2000s Japanese films
2001 films
Fictional ninja
Film superheroes
Japanese action films
Japanese drama television series
Japan-exclusive video games
Live-action films based on manga
Mitsuteru Yokoyama
Ninja in anime and manga
Ninja fiction
Fuji TV original programming
Nippon TV original programming
Video games about ninja
Nintendo Entertainment System games
Shogakukan franchises
Shogakukan manga
Superhero television shows
Tokusatsu television series
Toei tokusatsu
Toei Animation television